KCX may refer to:

 KC-X, a United States Air Force program
 kcx, the ISO 639-3 code for the Kachama-Ganjule language